David Sjodahl King (June 20, 1917 – May 5, 2009) was a representative from Utah. He was a member of the Democratic Party.

Early life and education 
King was born in Salt Lake City, Utah, in 1917. He graduated from the University of Utah in 1937.  From 1937 to 1939, he served as a missionary for the Church of Jesus Christ of Latter-day Saints (LDS Church) in Great Britain.  After his mission, King attended and graduated from Georgetown University Law School.  After serving as a clerk for Justice Howard M. Stephens of the United States Court of Appeals for the District of Columbia in 1943, King returned to Utah.

Legal and political career 
In Utah, King served as counsel to the Utah Tax Commission from 1944 to 1946.  He also was involved in private practice from 1945.  From 1946 to 1958, he taught commercial law at Intermountain Business College. From 1948 to 1958, King was the second assistant to Elbert R. Curtis, who was the ninth General Superintendent of the church's Young Men's Mutual Improvement Association.

King was elected as a Democrat to the 86th and 87th United States Congresses between January 3, 1959 and January 3, 1963. He was not a candidate for renomination in 1962, choosing instead to run for a seat in the United States Senate. His senatorial campaign was unsuccessful. King was elected to the 89th Congress in 1964, but was defeated in his bid for reelection in 1966. He was appointed United States Ambassador to Madagascar and to Mauritius in January 1967 and in May 1968, respectively, serving in those two positions concurrently until August 1969.

During the 1970s and 1980s, King practiced law in Washington, D.C., and served as an alternate director at the World Bank.  He retired in 1986 to devote his time to serving the LDS Church.

LDS Church service in retirement 
From July 1986 to June 1989, he served as president of the church's Haiti Port-au-Prince Mission.   King served from September 1990 to 1993 as the president of the Washington D.C. Temple in Kensington, Maryland. In November 1994, he was called to serve as a patriarch for the Washington D.C. Stake and the District of Columbia District.

Family life 
King was a resident of Kensington, Maryland where he lived with his wife of 61 years, Rosalie King.  They were the parents of eight children, including Josephine "Jody" Olsen who became Director of the Peace Corps in 2018. His father, William H. King, was a Senator from Utah. He was preceded in death by his sons David King, Jr., and Elliott West King. David King died on May 5, 2009, and was buried in Parklawn Memorial Cemetery.

Genealogy 
King was a direct patrilineal descendant of Edmund Rice, an English immigrant to Massachusetts Bay Colony, as follows:

David Sjodahl King, son of
 William Henry King, (1863 – 1949), son of
 William King (1834 – 1892), son of
 Thomas Rice King (1813 – 1879), son of
 Thomas King (1770 – 1845), son of
 William King (1724 – 1793), son of
 Ezra Rice King (1697 – 1746), son of
 Samuel Rice King (1667 – 1713), son of
 Samuel Rice (1634 – 1684), son of
 Edmund Rice (1594 – 1663)

Published works

See also 
 Janne M. Sjödahl: maternal grandfather
 Josephine K. Olsen: daughter

References

External links
Materials relating to David S. King at L. Tom Perry Special Collections, Harold B. Lee Library, Brigham Young University

1917 births
2009 deaths
Politicians from Salt Lake City
American leaders of the Church of Jesus Christ of Latter-day Saints
20th-century Mormon missionaries
Mormon missionaries in Haiti
American Mormon missionaries in England
University of Utah alumni
Georgetown University Law Center alumni
Counselors in the General Presidency of the Young Men (organization)
Mission presidents (LDS Church)
Patriarchs (LDS Church)
People from Kensington, Maryland
Temple presidents and matrons (LDS Church)
Ambassadors of the United States to the Comoros
Ambassadors of the United States to Madagascar
Ambassadors of the United States to Mauritius
American people of Swedish descent
Burials at Parklawn Memorial Park
Democratic Party members of the United States House of Representatives from Utah
20th-century American politicians
Latter Day Saints from Utah
Latter Day Saints from Washington, D.C.
20th-century American diplomats